Reason is an Indian documentary film in English and Hindi (Hindi title is Vivek) languages duration with 218 minutes directed by Anand Patwardhan. The film premiered at the 2018 Toronto International Film Festival and though never officially released in India, has been screened in private and on youtube.

Award
The documentary, Reason has selected as the best documentary at the 31st International Documentary Film Festival Amsterdam.

References

External links 
 
 Official Website
 Anand Patwardhan's new documentary Reason, about India's saffron invasion, premieres at TIFF 2018
 Reason/Vivek

Indian documentary films
2018 films